On May 27, 1815, Representative Matthew Clay (DR) of  died in office before the start of the 1st session of the 14th Congress.  A special election was held in October of that year to fill the resulting vacancy.

Election results

Kerr had been defeated for re-election in the regular 1815 elections and took his seat December 5, 1815, at the start of the 1st session.

See also
List of special elections to the United States House of Representatives

References

Special elections to the 14th United States Congress
1815 15
Virginia 1815 15
1815 Virginia elections
Virginia 15
United States House of Representatives 1815 15